La Ruche, Fontvieille is an industrial building in the Principality of Monaco.

History

Erection and inauguration

It was built by Monaco's Public Works Office.

La Ruche was inaugurated in 2003, in the presence of various public and industrial figures as well as diplomatic and consular representatives.

2004 incident

On May 31, 2004, La Ruche and the neighboring Stade Louis II were damaged by an apparently deliberate explosion. No injuries occurred and the responsibility remained unclear. The damage, while relatively extensive to portions of the fabric of the buildings, was verified as not having affected the buildings' respective structures. 

On June 1, the Government of Monaco announced that it would assume responsibility for repairs to the damage caused by the explosion, without preempting the results of expert investigations, which continued. This incident constituted a rare exception to Monaco's long established reputation for safety and absence of violence.

External links
https://web.archive.org/web/20070105190706/http://monaco.net/communiques/2003112101.htm
https://web.archive.org/web/20070113004225/http://monaco.net/communiques/2004050201.htm

Industrial buildings in Monaco
2003 establishments in Monaco
Fontvieille, Monaco
Industrial buildings completed in 2003